Franz Gräffer (6 January 1785 – 8 October 1852) was an Austrian librarian, bookseller and writer. He was a founder of the Österreichische National-Encyklopädie, regarded as the first comprehensive reference work about Austria.

Life
Gräffer was born in Vienna in 1785; his father August Gräffer opened in 1790 a bookshop specializing in military books, and he wrote about military history. Franz in his early career joined his father's business. Afterwards he opened an antiquarian bookshop and was a publisher, making unsuccessful plans to produce magazines. He also began the trade for autographs in Vienna.

He was a freelance writer, from 1812 writing numerous works about the cultural history and customs of Vienna, some published anonymously or pseudonymously. With Johann Jakob Czikann (1789–1855) he founded the Österreichische National-Encyklopädie (6 volumes, 1835–37), regarded as the first comprehensive reference work about Austria.

In later years he became mentally ill; he died impoverished in a mental hospital in 1852. His biographer in Biographisches Lexikon des Kaiserthums Oesterreich wrote: "Gräffer was, in his innermost character, after all no businessman, but a scholar by calling, burdened with all the weaknesses and advantages of those often eccentric people."

References

1785 births
1852 deaths
Writers from Vienna
Austrian librarians
19th-century Austrian writers
Historians of Austria
Austrian booksellers